Hole in the Wall is a trivia party game based on the American game show that first aired on the Fox Broadcasting Company in 2008–2009 before getting picked up by Cartoon Network in 2010. It was developed by Ludia and published by Microsoft Game Studios for Xbox Live Arcade in 2011.

Reception

The game received "generally unfavorable reviews" according to the review aggregation website Metacritic.

Since its release, the game sold 21,196 units worldwide by the end of 2011.

References

External links
 

2011 video games
Cartoon Network video games
Kinect games
Ludia games
Microsoft games
Party video games
Video games based on game shows
Video games developed in Canada
Xbox 360 games
Xbox 360-only games
Xbox 360 Live Arcade games
Multiplayer and single-player video games